Chunghwa Telecom Company, Ltd. is the largest integrated telecom service provider in Taiwan, and the incumbent local exchange carrier of PSTN, Mobile, and broadband services in the country.

History 
Chunghwa Telecom was founded as a company on June 15, 1996 as part of the Taiwanese government's privatization efforts.

The company's common shares have been listed on the Taiwan Stock Exchange under the number "2412" since October 2000, and its ADSs have been listed on the New York Stock Exchange under the symbol "CHT" since July 2003.

In August 2005, Chunghwa Telecom became a privatized company, as the Taiwan government's ownership was reduced to less than 50%.

The Directorate General of Telecommunications once exercised a monopoly on the telecommunications market in Taiwan. To make the telecommunications industry more competitive and improve service quality, the Ministry of Transportation and Communications began to promote "telecommunications liberalization" policy from the late 1980s, in which the telecom industry would gradually be opened to private industry operations. The liberalization of telecommunications, as well as the management and operation of telecommunications business as mentioned in the plan, aimed to achieve "separation between government and enterprises".

On July 1, 1996, the "Chunghwa Telecom Ordinance" was enacted under an amendment of the "Telecommunications Act", which formally established Chunghwa Telecom Co. Ltd. with a capital of NT$96.477 billion yuan, operating first class and second class telecom services, under the "Taiwan Northern Telecom Branch", "Central Taiwan telecommunications branch", "Southern Taiwan telecommunications branch"," long-distance and mobile communications branch", "International Telecommunication Branch", "Data Communications Branch", "Telecommunications Research Institute" and "Telecommunications Training Institute".

In 1997, Chunghwa Telecom was awarded the license to operate a second-generation mobile communications (2G) network (GSM 900 MHz and 1800 MHz).

In October 2000, Chunghwa Telecom was listed on the Taiwan Stock Exchange under the ticker symbol "2412." In July 2003, Chunghwa Telecom was listed on the New York Stock Exchange under the symbol "CHT" and on 12 August 2005, the Government of China Telecom's stake to 50%, and officially became a private company.

In 2007, Chunghwa Telecom acquired Senao International, and Senao becomes the exclusive sales agent of Chunghwa Telecom mobile phones.

On May 1, 2007, Chunghwa Telecom set up a division for enterprise customers, incorporated in the Southern Taiwan telecommunications branch.

On October 30, 2013, Chunghwa Telecom acquired in an auction for NT$39.075 billion a spectrum of LTE bands (900 MHz B2 / 1800 MHz C2 / C5), with a  bandwidth limit of 2x35MHz, as well as C5-band (1800 MHz).

On May 29, 2014, Chunghwa Telecom held a press conference to announce the start of 4G LTE services on May 30, 2014, and this made Chunghwa Telecom the first telco in Taiwan to provide LTE services.

Chunghwa Telecom launched Taiwan's first 5G NR network on June 30, 2020, and has also announced the arrival of a Cloud Gaming service as part of its 5G package. The service has been developed in cooperation with Gamestream and Intel.

On Dec 10, 2022, Chunghwa Telecom has been selected as a member of both the 2022 Dow Jones Sustainability Indices (DJSI) - World Index and Emerging Markets Index.

Mobile networks

Subsidiaries 
Senao International Co., Ltd., a cellular phone distributor from which Senao Networks, manufacturer of data networking products and wireless telephones under the EnGenius and Senao brands was spun off.
Light Era Development Co.
Donghwa Telecom Co., Ltd.
Chunghwa Telecom Singapore Pte., Ltd.
Chunghwa System Integration Co., Ltd.
Chunghwa Investment Co., Ltd.
CHIEF Telecom Inc.
CHYP Multimedia Marketing & Communications Co., Ltd.
Prime Asia Investments Group Ltd. (B.V.I.) 
Spring House Entertainment Tech. Inc.
Chunghwa Telecom Global, Inc.
Chunghwa Telecom Vietnam Co., Ltd.
Smartfun Digital Co., Ltd.
Chunghwa Telecom Japan Co., Ltd.
Chunghwa Sochamp Technology Inc.
Honghwa International Co., Ltd.
Chunghwa Leading Photonics Tech Co., Ltd.
Chunghwa Telecom (Thailand) Co., Ltd.
CHT Security Co., Ltd.
International Integrated Systems, Inc.

See also
 List of companies of Taiwan
 Taiwan Mobile
 Far EasTone
 Taiwan Star Telecom

References

External links 

 Official website

Taiwanese companies established in 1996
Companies based in Taipei
Companies listed on the New York Stock Exchange
Companies listed on the Taiwan Stock Exchange
Mobile phone companies of Taiwan
Taiwanese brands
Telecommunications companies established in 1996
Telecommunications companies of Taiwan